Central High School is a public high school located at 5321 Jacksboro Pike in the Fountain City neighborhood of Knoxville, Tennessee, operated by the Knox County school system.The school's athletic teams are nicknamed the Bobcats, and its colors are red and black.

History 
Central was formerly located at what is now Gresham Middle School in the heart of Fountain City, which, in the 1960s, was the largest unincorporated community in Tennessee.  Its name is something of a misnomer, because it was never located near the center of Knoxville, even when Fountain City was annexed into Knoxville in the early 1960s.  The northernmost high school in Knoxville before the annexation of Fountain City was Fulton, and in the county, Powell, Karns, and Halls high schools were farther north.

2008 shooting 
On August 21, 2008, 15-year-old student Jamar Siler entered the school cafeteria and approached student Ryan McDonald sitting at a lunch table. Siler fatally shot McDonald, and was arrested by authorities a short time later. The two had been in previous altercations, the details of which were not released to the general public. Siler was then taken into custody.

Siler was initially tried as a juvenile until Tim Irwin, Juvenile Court judge, ordered that he be tried as an adult.  In November 2011, at age 18, Siler pleaded guilty to second-degree murder and received a 30-year sentence.
Siler is currently incarcerated in the Trousdale Turner Correctional Center.

Notable alumni

 Roy Acuff, country music star
 Trevor Bayne, NASCAR driver who won the 2011 Daytona 500
 Kelsea Ballerini, country music star
 Reggie Cobb, former Tampa Bay Buccaneers running back
 Tony Cosey, Olympic steeplechase runner
 Michele Carringer, state legislator.
 Ray Graves, football player at Tennessee and head football coach at Florida
 Todd Helton, professional baseball player
 Scott Holtzman, UFC Lightweight Fighter
 Frankie Housley, heroic flight attendant
Con Hunley, American country music singer
 Tim Irwin, former Minnesota Vikings lineman, former University of Tennessee lineman, Judge of Juvenile Court, Knox County, Tennessee
Josh Lovelace, singer, songwriter and musician best known as the keyboardist for the rock band Needtobreathe.
 Terrence Scott, British Columbia Lions Football Player
 Steve Searcy, baseball player
 William T. Snyder, Chancellor of University of Tennessee-Knoxville (1992-1999) and house organist at the Tennessee Theater
 Robert Lee Suffridge,(March 17, 1916 – March 3, 1974) was an American football player in the National Football League for the Philadelphia Eagles. He played college football at the University of Tennessee, where he was later inducted into the school's hall of fame and the College Football Hall of Fame. Suffridge also served in the United States Navy during World War II.
 Jennifer Tipton, Tony Award-winning lighting designer
 Bubba Trammell, baseball player
 Richard Aaker Trythall, pianist and composer
Chris Zachary, Major League Baseball pitcher

References

External links
 Official website

Public high schools in Tennessee
Schools in Knoxville, Tennessee
Educational institutions established in 1906
1906 establishments in Tennessee